Eric Albert Jespersen (born October 18, 1961, in Port Alberni, British Columbia) is a Canadian sailor.

He won a bronze medal with Ross MacDonald in the men's Star event at the 1992 Summer Olympics and finished 14th at the 1996 Summer Olympics in the same event.

External links
 
 

1961 births
Canadian male sailors (sport)
Living people
Olympic bronze medalists for Canada
Olympic medalists in sailing
Olympic sailors of Canada
People from Port Alberni
Sailors at the 1992 Summer Olympics – Star
Sailors at the 1996 Summer Olympics – Star
Sportspeople from British Columbia
Star class world champions
Medalists at the 1992 Summer Olympics
World champions in sailing for Canada
20th-century Canadian people